As with any such statistic, there are a number of claims for the title "the longest bar in Australia":

 Mildura, Victoria: The Mildura Working Man's Sports & Social Club built a T-shaped bar in 1938. It was believed to be the longest bar in Victoria. In 1970 it was rebuilt with a hook and was noted in the Guinness Book of Records as holding world record length status. The bar was removed in 1995 during renovations to add poker machines.
 Big Bell, Western Australia: the hotel of an abandoned township in the Murchison region in Western Australia. 
 Wiluna, Western Australia: The old Weeloona Hotel (demolished in the mid-1970s) was reputed to have the world's longest bar. 

See also
 List of public house topics
 Six o'clock swill

References

 
Drinking establishments in Australia
Bar